Nathaly Junko Shimizu Kurata (born 10 February 1993) is an inactive Brazilian tennis player.

She has career-high WTA rankings of 399 in singles, achieved on 16 July 2018, and 387 in doubles, reached on 24 November 2014. Kurata has won four singles and five doubles titles on the ITF Women's Circuit.

She made her debut for Brazil Fed Cup team in 2018.

ITF Circuit finals

Singles: 8 (4 titles, 4 runner-ups)

Doubles: 19 (5 titles, 14 runner-ups)

External links
 
 
 

1993 births
Living people
Brazilian female tennis players
Brazilian people of Japanese descent
Competitors at the 2010 South American Games
20th-century Brazilian women
21st-century Brazilian women